The Subaru 360 is a rear-engined, two-door city car manufactured and marketed from 1958 to 1971 by Subaru.  As the company's first automobile, production reached 392,000 over its 12-year model run.

Noted for its small overall size, 1,000 lb curb weight, monocoque construction, swing axle rear suspension, fiberglass roof panel, and rear-hinged doors, the inexpensive car was designed in response to the Japanese government's light car or Kei car regulations and its proposal for a larger "national car," both intended to help motorize the post WWII Japanese population. The 360's overall size and engine capacity complied with Japan's Kei car regulations.

Nicknamed the "ladybug" in Japan, and ultimately superseded by R-2, the 360 was one of Japan's most popular cars and was available in a single generation in two-door, station wagon ("Custom"), "convertible" (a sedan with a roll-back fabric roof) and sporting variants. The two-door sedans' model code is K111, while the wagon is known as K142. Ten thousand were sold in the United States, imported by Malcolm Bricklin and advertised as "Cheap and Ugly."

The nameplate 360 derived from its tax-limited engine displacement: 356 cc.

Design 
The 360 featured an air-cooled, two-stroke inline 2-cylinder 356 cc engine mounted transversely at the rear, and was introduced March 3, 1958.

As with the two-stroke Saab 93s and other small two-stroke gas engines, oil needed to be premixed with the petrol (gasoline), with the fuel tank lid serving as a measuring cup. In 1964, the "Subarumatic" lubrication system provided automatic mixing via a reservoir in the engine compartment.

Floor-mounted controls located between the driver and passenger seat included choke, heater and fuel cut-off — the latter to accommodate gravity fed fuel which obviated the need for a fuel pump. The initial production featured a full metal dash board and three-speed manual gearbox, while subsequent models featured a partially padded dash with an open glove compartment, pop-out rear quarter windows, split front bench seat, map pockets, a four-speed manual and optional three-speed-based 'Autoclutch' transmission — the latter which eliminated the clutch pedal and operated the clutch via an electromagnet.

Final assembly included wheel alignment, brake testing, chassis dynometer, headlight testing, and high-pressure water spray testing.

In contrast to the Volkswagen Beetle, the 360 is much smaller, less powerful, and was not nearly as well accepted in the global marketplace. The body was of monocoque construction and used a lightweight fiberglass roof panel. In the post war period, more automobiles would switch to unibody construction, which is now the norm for passenger cars and even many light trucks. Many of the ideas came from engineers from the former Nakajima Aircraft Company, which became Fuji Heavy Industries. The "suicide doors" are hinged at the rear, which Consumer Reports remarked could and did result in a partially locked door pulling open in the wind during testing.

Performance 
Consumer Reports recorded a 0-60 time of about 37 seconds and reported ,  despite Subaru's claimed . When introduced in 1958, the 360's engine produced .

Variants 
Several variants were produced, including a station wagon (called the Custom), a convertible, and two sport models known as 1) the Subaru Young S, which had a slightly upgraded (EK32 "F") engine and transmission (4 gears instead of 3), bucket seats and a tachometer along with a black, white striped roof with a dent along the middle to put one's surfboard, and 2) the Subaru Young SS, which had all the Young S enhancements, but also the EK32 "S" engine with chromed cylinders and dual BS32 Mikuni Solex carburetors, producing  - and 100 brake horsepower per litre.
From 1961 onwards, a flat-nosed truck and van called the Sambar were also produced using the 360's engine, with arrangements similar to the Volkswagen Transporter in a smaller size. Many small businesses became very successful thanks to the pickup's small size for tight streets, quickness, ease to drive and great fuel economy. Available in Japan between November 1960 and 1966, an export version, known as the Subaru 450, increased the engine's displacement to 423 cc using the Subaru EK51 series engine. This model was also given the name Subaru Maia. The Maia variant was the sole sedan model imported into Australia (approximately 35 examples) in 1961 - along with approximately 38 Sambar vans and trucks.

Export 

A used car dealer in Ballarat, Victoria (Frank O'Brien) brought approximately 73 Subaru 360 vehicles into Australia in 1961. This was a mix of Maia sedans and Sambar vans and trucks. Unfortunately they suffered from overheating problems and although a solution was eventually found, it came too late, as the associated losses were too great for the dealership to cope with and further importations ceased.

From 1968, approximately 10,000 were exported to the US, with an original price of $1,297 ($ in  dollars ). The 360 was imported to the United States by Malcolm Bricklin before he later manufactured his own cars. The Subaru 360 received notoriety in 1969, when Consumer Reports magazine branded the automobile "Not Acceptable" because of safety concerns and lack of power. Because the car weighed under 1000 pounds, it was exempt from normal safety standards, but it was reported that it fared badly in a test crash against a large American car with the bumper ending up in the passenger compartment of the Subaru.

Sales soon collapsed, and there were various rumors of Subaru 360s being tossed overboard or being shredded to pieces. It was also reported that many 360s sat on dealers' lots for two or three years without ever being purchased.

The Subaru 360 was replaced by the less popular but more advanced R-2 which was quickly superseded by the long-lived Subaru Rex model.

Notes 

History of Subaru Kei Jidosha

External links 

 Subaru 360 Driver's Club
 Subaru 360 manuals page

360
Coupés
Kei cars
Rear-engined vehicles
Rear-wheel-drive vehicles
Cars introduced in 1958
Cars powered by 2-cylinder engines
1960s cars
1970s cars